Inland Productions was a video game developer based out of Carol Stream, Illinois. It developed software mainly for video game consoles and for PCs.

Inland Productions was founded by two former employees of development company Studio E. In early 1997 Studio E filed a lawsuit against the two founders and Inland Productions' publisher, THQ, alleging that their former employees had reneged on a deal to finish the game VMX Racing and used equipment that was Studio E property to start up Inland Productions.

Games developed

Games ported

References

External links
 Company summary from MobyGames
 Company summary from GameSpot
 Company summary from IGN

Video game companies of the United States
Defunct software companies of the United States